Zen Guerrilla was a rock band originally from Newark, Delaware and later based in San Francisco, California. Musically, the band evolved over their career. Their early sound was characterized by psychedelic elements, such as delayed guitars and noise washes. Their unique sound gained a growing local following (winning several Philly music awards), however, did not increase marketability. Later, Zen Guerrilla fused blues, rock and gospel to create a sound which could be likened to bands such as the Jon Spencer Blues Explosion.

History
Zen Guerrilla formed in Newark, Delaware in the late 80s. Band members Andy Duvall (drums), Marcus Durant (vocals/harmonica),  Carl Horne (bass), Daniel McMullen (keyboard) and Rich Millman (guitar) came together from local bands Marcus Hook, The Gollywogs, Stone Groove and No Comment.

Their early sound was characterized by psychedelic elements, such as delayed guitars and noise washes played by The Sloth (before leaving the band in 1991). This unique sound gained a growing local following (their first two color vinyl 45s winning several Philly music awards), while avoiding increased marketability.

Later, the band released their self-titled CD on Philadelphia-based Compulsiv Records in 1992 and recorded at the world-famous Third Story Recording Studio in Walnut Hill with producer/engineer, Scott "Turkey Lips" Herzog. Soon after, Zen Guerrilla moved to Philadelphia and were regular performers around the city at clubs such as the Khyber Pass Pub. Around this time the band began a heavy touring schedule, which would have them cross the country multiple times through the end of the decade.

Zen Guerrilla relocated to San Francisco in 1994. Their constant touring increased their exposure, and, combined with their explosive live show, helped to release albums first with Alternative Tentacles and later Sub Pop, which is known for being the original record company of Nirvana.

The band's version of the song "Empty Heart" was featured in the 2000 PlayStation game Grind Session.

The band dissolved sometime around 2003.

Discography

Albums
Zen Guerrilla - Compulsiv 1992 
Invisible "Liftee" Pad / Gap-Tooth Clown - Alternative Tentacles 1997 
Positronic Raygun - Alternative Tentacles 1998 
Trance States in Tongues - Sub Pop 1999 
Shadows on the Sun - Sub Pop 2001 
Heavy Mellow - Flapping Jet 2002 (LP picture disc)

EPs
Creature Double Feature - Dead Beat records 1995
Invisible "Liftee" Pad - Insect 1996 
Gap-Tooth Clown - Insect 1997 
Plasmic Tears and the Invisible City - Insect 2002

Singles
"Pull" b/w "Nile Song" - Union Hall 1993 
"Crow" b/w "Unusual" - Union Hall 1994 
"Trouble Shake" b/w "Change Gonna Come" - Alternative Tentacles 1997 
"Ghetto City Version" b/w "Hungry Wolf" - Epitaph 1999 
"Mama's Little Rocket" - Allied Recordings 2000 
"Dirty Mile" b/w "Ham and Eggs" - Estrus 2000 
"Pocketful of String" b/w "Wigglin' Room" - Fanboy 2000 
"The Seeker" b/w "Half Step" - Sub Pop 2000 
"Mob Rules" b/w "The Trooper" - Safety Pin 2001

References

External links
  Andy Duvall's new band 'Carlton Melton'
 The Carl Horne Experiment solo act of bassist.
 Browntown West 3/4 of band doing cover songs with Christa DiBiase on vocals.

Musical groups from San Francisco